Pebworth Halt railway station served the village of Pebworth, Worcestershire, England from 1937 to 1966 on the Gloucestershire Warwickshire Railway.

History 
The station opened on 6 September 1937 by the Great Western Railway. It only cost £430 to build and open. In September 1945 the station had recorded a mere 876 passengers. The station closed on 3 January 1966.

References

External links 

Disused railway stations in Worcestershire
Former Great Western Railway stations
Railway stations opened in 1937
Railway stations closed in 1966
1937 establishments in England
1966 disestablishments in England
Beeching closures in England
Railway stations in Great Britain opened in the 20th century